Alexander William Menzies (25 November 1882 – 1964) was a Scottish footballer who played as a forward for Heart of Midlothian and Manchester United in the 1900s.

Born in Blantyre, South Lanarkshire, Menzies began his football career with local Blantyre Victoria in 1901. He signed for Hearts in December 1902, making two appearances for the club before being sent on loan to Motherwell then Arthurlie for a season apiece. On his return to Hearts he became a regular in the side, winning the Scottish Cup in 1906.

In November 1906 Menzies was sold to Manchester United. He played for the Red Devils until the end of the 1906–07 season, making 25 appearances and scoring four goals, before being sold to Luton Town. He then moved back to Scotland with Dundee, Hamilton Academical and Port Glasgow Athletic, before finishing his career at Dumbarton.

Menzies made one appearance for Scotland, a 2–1 win over England in April 1906.

References

External links
Hearts profile at LondonHearts.com
Man Utd profile at StretfordEnd.co.uk

1882 births
People from Blantyre, South Lanarkshire
Scottish footballers
Association football forwards
Heart of Midlothian F.C. players
Motherwell F.C. players
Manchester United F.C. players
Luton Town F.C. players
Dundee F.C. players
Hamilton Academical F.C. players
Port Glasgow Athletic F.C. players
Dumbarton F.C. players
1964 deaths 
Date of death missing
Blantyre Victoria F.C. players
Arthurlie F.C. players
Scotland international footballers
Footballers from South Lanarkshire
Place of death missing
English Football League players
Scottish Junior Football Association players
Scottish Football League players